Georg Winkler was a climber famed for his solo ascents which included the Winkler Turme in the Vajolet Towers in 1887, at the age of 17. He was killed by an avalanche on the face of the Weisshorn in 1888.

Notes

1888 deaths
German mountain climbers
Year of birth missing